Hans Zikeli (October 10, 1910 – February 6, 1999) was a Romanian field handball player of German origin who competed in the 1936 Summer Olympics.

He was part of the Romanian field handball team, which finished fifth in the Olympic tournament. He played two matches.

References
Notice of death 
Hans Zikeli's profile at Sports Reference.com

1910 births
1999 deaths
Field handball players at the 1936 Summer Olympics
Olympic handball players of Romania
Romanian male handball players
Transylvanian Saxon people